The Shadow on the Wall is a 1925 American silent mystery film directed by B. Reeves Eason and starring Eileen Percy, Creighton Hale, and William V. Mong.

Cast
 Eileen Percy as Lucia Warring 
 Creighton Hale as George Walters 
 William V. Mong as Robert Glaxton 
 Dale Fuller as The Missus 
 Jack Curtis as Bleary 
 Hardee Kirkland as Hode 
 Willis Marks as George Warring

References

Bibliography
 Munden, Kenneth White. The American Film Institute Catalog of Motion Pictures Produced in the United States, Part 1. University of California Press, 1997.

External links
 

1925 films
1925 mystery films
American silent feature films
American mystery films
Films directed by B. Reeves Eason
American black-and-white films
Films based on American novels
Gotham Pictures films
1920s English-language films
1920s American films
Silent mystery films